The general somatic afferent fibers (GSA, or somatic sensory fibers) afferent fibers arise from neurons in sensory ganglia and are found in all the spinal nerves, except occasionally the first cervical, and conduct impulses of pain, touch and temperature from the surface of the body through the dorsal roots to the spinal cord and impulses of muscle sense, tendon sense and joint sense from the deeper structures.

See also
 Afferent nerve

References

Spinal cord